is a private junior college in Mizuho-ku, Nagoya, Japan.

History 
The junior college was founded in 1939 as girls' school, . It was chartered as a college in 1950 for women and renamed Aichi Mizuho Junior College. The junior college is offered to dietitians, school nursing, nutrition instructor, and  junior high school teacher.

See also 
 Aichi Mizuho College

External links 
  

Educational institutions established in 1950
Japanese junior colleges
Universities and colleges in Aichi Prefecture
1950 establishments in Japan